This was the first edition of the tournament.

Roman Jebavý and Andrés Molteni won the title, defeating Máximo González and Horacio Zeballos in the final, 6–4, 7–6(7–4).

Seeds

Draw

Draw

References

External links
 Main Draw

Córdoba Open
Córdoba Open
Copa